Alfonsina's Airstrip  is the privately owned public-use dirt airstrip of "Alfonsina's Resort", located in San Luis Gonzaga, Municipality of Ensenada, Baja California, Mexico, on the San Luis Gonzaga Bay located on the Gulf of California coast. The runway is constructed on a narrow sandpit, so it may be partially submerged during high tides (new or full moon).

External links
Baja Bush Pilots forum about Alfonsina's airstrip.
Alfonsina's Photo.

Airports in Baja California